Mederic may refer to:

Mederic (king), a 4th-century Alemannic petty king
Mederic (monk), a 7th-century French saint